Homa Bay County is a county in the former Nyanza Province of Kenya. Its capital and largest town is Homa Bay. The county has a population of 1,131,950 (2019 census) and an area of 3,154.7 km2. Lake Victoria is a major source of livelihood for Homa Bay County. It has 40 wards, each represented by an MCA to the assembly in Homa Bay town as its headquarters.

Homa Bay County has eight sub counties just like the constituencies.

Demographics 
Homa Bay County has a total population of 1,131,950 persons, of which 539,560 are males, 592,367 females and 23 intersex persons. It has 262,036 households with an average of 4.3 people per household. The county has a population density of 359 people per square kilometre.

Source

Administrative and political units

Administrative Units 
The county has been subdivided into 8 sub-counties with 40 county assembly wards. There are a total of 19 divisions, with 116 locations and 226 sub-locations.

Electoral constituencies
The county has eight electoral constituencies: 
Homa Bay Town Constituency
Kabondo Kasipul Constituency
Karachuonyo Constituency
Kasipul Constituency
Suba North Constituency
Ndhiwa Constituency
Rangwe Constituency
Suba South Constituency

Political leadership 
Gladys Wanga is the current governor after being elected in the 2022 general elections that took place in August 9. Moses Otieno Kajwang’ is the senator and was elected in 2015 in a by election due to the death of his brother, Gerald Otieno Kajwang. He retained his seat in the 2017 General elections. Gladys Atieno Nyasuna Wanga is the second woman representative to hold office after being elected in 2017.

Members of parliament

Homa Bay Town constituency Hon. Peter Opondo Kaluma, Ndhiwa constituency Hon. Martin Peters Owino, Kasipul constituency Hon. Sir Charles On'gondo Were, Mbita constituency Hon. Millie Grace Akoth Mabona Odhiambo, Karachuonyo constituency Hon. Andrew Adipo Okuome, Suba South constituency Hon. John Ng'ongo Mbadi, Rangwe constituency Hon. Lilian Achieng Gogo, Kabondo kasipul costituency Hon. Eve Akinyi Obara. All of the above members of parliament were elected on ODM party tickets led by the former prime minister, The Right Honourable Raila Amollo Odinga.

Health 
There are a total of 206 health facilities across the county of which 144 are public and 62 are private.  
Source

Education 
The county has 1451 ECD centres of which are 991 public and 460 private. There are 1089 primary schools, 312 secondary schools, 50 youth polytechnic, 2 technical training institutions, 2 university colleges.

Source

Transport and communication 
The county is covered by road network of 3225 km of which 1840 is covered by earth surface, 1240 km is gravel and 184 km is covered by bitumen. There are 13 postal services with 3,300 installed letter boxes, 1,605 rented letter boxes 1,695 vacant letter boxes.

Trade and commerce 
The county grows a variety of agricultural crops based on the ecological zones found in the county. Coffee, sugarcane, maize, beans, tobacco, dairy and fish farming in Rachuonyo subcounty. Maize, millet, pineapples, sorghum, sunflower and tomatoes are grown in Gwasi Hills of Suba. Millet, green grams, tobacco, sugarcane, pineapples, sisal are grown in Ndhiwa, Homa Bay town and Rangwe. Cotton was grown in Rachuonyo and central Mbita before the collapse of the cotton industry. There are efforts that are underway to revive cotton farming across the county. Some of the animals kept in the county include dairy cattle, beef cattle, sheep, hair goats, dairy goats, meat pigs, rabbit and poultry.

Villages and settlements
 Andiwo's Village
 Awach Tende
 Awino
 Ayugis
 Akelo's Village

See also
Andiwo's Village
Migori County
Kisii County
Nyamira County
Kericho County
Kisumu County
Siaya County
Lake Victoria
Sindo Township

References

External links
Map of the District

 
Counties of Kenya